Alobha (Sanskrit, Pali; Tibetan Wylie: ma chags pa) is a Buddhist term translated as "non-attachment" or "non-greed". It is defined as the absence of attachment or desire towards worldly things or worldly existence. It causes one to not engage in unwholesome actions.  It is one of the virtuous mental factors within the Abhidharma teachings. 

The Abhidharma-samuccaya states: 

What is alobha? It is not to be attached to a mode of life and all that is involved with it. It functions in providing the basis for not being caught up in non-virtuous action.

See also 
 Adosa (Non-hatred)
 Amoha (Non-delusion)
 Buddhist paths to liberation
 Mental factors (Buddhism)

Notes

References 
 Guenther, Herbert V. &  Leslie S. Kawamura (1975), Mind in Buddhist Psychology: A Translation of Ye-shes rgyal-mtshan's "The Necklace of Clear Understanding". Dharma Publishing. Kindle Edition.
 Kunsang, Erik Pema (translator) (2004). Gateway to Knowledge, Vol. 1. North Atlantic Books.

External links 
 Ranjung Yeshe wiki entry for ma_chags_pa

Wholesome factors in Buddhism
Sanskrit words and phrases